Westlife songlist covers the band's original, remake, and remixed songs.

Originals
Westlife have recorded and released 148 original songs which were composed by either the band or external songwriters.

A The song has a mastered version of a different artist but was not included and released on any of the said artist's album.

Covers
13 songs among these have become official singles as the lead artist, two renditions as a featured artist, six as promotional singles, and seven are included on their other charted songs list.

A The song has a mastered version of a different artist but was not included and released on any of the said artist's album.
B Unreleased

Remixes

This is a list of Westlife song remixes.

A The following remixes were not included and released on any album. Hence, it appeared and leaked on the internet at that time.

B-sides

Recorded concert live tracks
All filmed concert tracks are uploaded on Westlife's official YouTube page or released in an official video album.

Recorded filmed concert original tracks

Unfilmed recorded concert original tracks

Recorded filmed concert cover tracks

Unfilmed recorded concert cover tracks

A In order of appearance

Other recorded live event performances

Recorded originals

Recorded covers

Other recorded appearances

A In order of appearance

Unreleased songs

See also

 Westlife videography
 Westlife discography
 Westlife tours
 Boy band
 Westlife awards
 List of artists who reached number one on the UK Singles Chart
 List of artists who reached number one in Ireland

References

External links

 Official Westlife Website

Lists of songs recorded by Irish artists
 

hu:Westlife-diszkográfia